Erik Alfred Faber-Swensson (born May 16, 1977 in Kristiansand) is a popular Norwegian pop/rock singer-songwriter, who has released 3 albums.

Life before music
As a student in London, Erik Faber was offered a job as a model. He has done photo shoots for magazines like The Face and Arena. He has also taken part in fashion shows for Diesel and Evisu.

Music career
Erik Faber started his music career with the grunge group Pale. He was first a guitarist and then the lead singer of the group. Pale released an EP in 1996 named "Happy Hollow". He left the band in 1999.

In 2001 Sony BMG offered him a contract and in 2002 his debut album Between The Lines was released. Four singles from this album ("On Top of the World", "Between the Lines", "Waiting", and "Sleep") became huge radio hits and reached the Norwegian Top 20 radio charts. The next year, his second album Century came out with singles "Century" and "Yesterday's Call" standing out. The album made it to the Top 10 Albums in the Norwegian Charts. Erik Faber's much anticipated third album was released in 2006. The album is called Passages and includes the international hit single "Not Over" and his duet with Marte Wulff "Racing".

In 2011 he released his first album outside of Norway, a German album called Not Over. The album consists of ten tracks from his previous albums, as well as three newly recorded songs.

Discography

Studio albums

Compilation albums

Singles

References

External links
 Erik Faber's profile on NRK.no
 Erik Faber Biography on MIC Norway
 Erik Faber in Norwegian charts
 Erik Faber's Sony Music Germany page

1977 births
Norwegian pop singers
Norwegian songwriters
Living people
21st-century Norwegian singers
21st-century Norwegian male singers